The Public Quarry at Government Island in Stafford County, Virginia is the principal source of Aquia Creek sandstone, a building stone used in many of the early government buildings in Washington, D.C., including the U.S. Capitol and the White House.  A quarry was established just off the Potomac River at Wigginton's Island on Aquia Creek by George Brent after 1694, providing stone for tombstones and to houses and churches in northern Virginia, including Gunston Hall, Christ Church in Alexandria, Virginia, Mount Airy in Richmond County, Virginia, and Aquia Church, as well as steps and walkways at George Washington's Mount Vernon. Washington selected Aquia sandstone as the primary material for use in Washington's government buildings.  Acting on the government's behalf, the Wigginton's Island quarry was purchased by Pierre Charles L'Enfant in 1791, becoming known afterward as Government Island.

Use of the stone declined as its susceptibility to weathering was observed, and the quarry became worked out and derelict after the U.S. Civil War. The property was sold by the U.S. Government in 1963.

The property was acquired by Stafford County as a county park and opened to the public on November 6, 2010 with trails and markers highlighting the historical significance of the island. The park has 1.5 miles of trails including an elevated wooden boardwalk through marsh and wetlands, part of the park is handicap accessible.  It is a designated site on the Potomac Heritage National Scenic Trail. It was listed on the National Register of Historic Places in 2007.

References

External links
 Government Island

National Register of Historic Places in Stafford County, Virginia
Quarries in the United States
Industrial buildings and structures on the National Register of Historic Places in Virginia
Parks in Stafford County, Virginia
River islands of Virginia